Roman Guillermo Bravo-Young  (born January 28, 1999) is an American freestyle and folkstyle wrestler who competes internationally at 61 kilograms and collegiately at 133 pounds. In freestyle, he was the 2019 Junior Pan American champion and the 2018 U23 US national runner-up. As a folkstyle wrestler, Bravo-Young is the 2021 and 2022 NCAA Division I national champion and 2021 and 2022 Big Ten Conference champion (three-time finalist) and a three-time All-American out of the Pennsylvania State University.

Folkstyle career

High school 
Bravo-Young attended Sunnyside High School in Tucson, Arizona. He started wrestling in the varsity team as a freshman and did not lose a single match through his four years of high school. At the DI state championships (AIA), he accumulated a combined record of 16–0 with eight falls, five majors, two technical falls and one decision and also received the outstanding wrestler award all four years he competed at the tournament. He graduated with a legendary record of 182–0 and was ranked #3 by InterMat and #5 by FloWrestling when he graduated.

In late October 2016, it was announced that Bravo-Young had committed to PSU's Cael Sanderson to wrestle as a Nittany Lion.

College

2018-19 
Bravo-Young did not redshirt and started wrestling as a true freshman at 133 pounds. During regular season, he won the Keystone Classic and placed third at the Southern Scuffle. He went 4–2 at the Big Ten Conference championships and placed fifth. He entered the NCAA championships as the tenth-seeded wrestler and went 4–3 to place eighth and claim All-America honors. He finished the season with a 25–7 record.

2019-20 
As a sophomore, Bravo-Young won the Black Knight Invitational and Wilkes Open and only lost one match, to top-ranked Seth Gross, a close 6–5 decision in the regular season. He went 2–1 at the Big Ten championship, losing in the finals to third-ranked Sebastian Rivera. Bravo-Young was scheduled to compete at the 2020 NCAA Championships, however, the event was cancelled due to the COVID-19 pandemic. He was expected to place higher than the prior year, as he had made major improvements. After the season, Bravo-Young earned All-American honors due to his performance through the year.

2020-21 
In October 2020, the NCAA granted an extra year of eligibility to winter athletes due to the prior season being cut short. During regular season, Bravo-Young compiled a 6–0 record to enter the post-season undefeated. Bravo-Young made his second straight final of the Big Ten Conference Championships, by defeating Jacob Rundell and Chris Cannon, before defeating rival and then-undefeated Austin DeSanto from Iowa to claim the title. At the NCAA championships, Bravo-Young comfortably made the semis, where he defeated fourth-seeded Korbin Myers of Virginia Tech to make the final against Daton Fix from Oklahoma State. In the bout, Bravo-Young accumulated a riding time point and an escape to secure a 2–0 lead in the first and second periods, before controversially getting called for stalling twice late in the third period and surrendering two points of his own to tie the match and go to overtime. In the first period of OT, Bravo-Young was able to secure a takedown late to defeat Fix and claim the NCAA title for Penn State. On June 29, Bravo-Young was named the Penn State Athlete of the Year along with Ally Schlegel of women's soccer.

Freestyle career

Age–group level 
Bravo-Young was a standout age-group level wrestler and his eligibility to compete at this level expired in early 2020. He competed as a cadet since 2014 until 2016 and compiled a record of 36–3, represented the United States at the World Championships and won a UWW National championship and two USAW National championships on his way. As a junior, he posted an 11–2 record and won a Pan American Championship, became runner-up at the US Nationals and placed third at the US World Team Trials.

Senior level

2017 
Even though he was still a junior in high school, Bravo-Young competed at the US Open as a senior in his first freestyle competition as such. He lost his first match and then he also lost his first match in the consolation bracket, being quickly eliminated from the tournament.

2018 
After being unable to compete at the US Junior Nationals due to an injury, the 19 year old Bravo–Young competed at the US U23 National Championships. He won by technical fall in all of his matches on his way to the semifinals, where he defeated one more opponent by points to make it to the finals. At the finals, which were also the U23 World Team Trials, he was defeated twice by Vitali Arujau, becoming the runner-up of the tournament.

2020 
After being unable to compete in any style due to the COVID-19 pandemic, Bravo-Young came back to freestyle and wrestled '19 NCAA runner-up Jack Mueller on July 25, at FloWrestling: Dake vs. Chamizo. He dominantly defeated Mueller after scoring eight points to one. Bravo-Young then competed against Shelton Mack on October 20, at the NLWC II. He won the match by technical fall after scoring eleven points no none. Bravo-Young then wrestled and grappled UFC title contender and two–time NCAA DIII All–American Aljamain Sterling on December 22, at the NLWC IV. He won the first match on points, and lost the second one by rear-naked choke.

2021 
After his NCAA championship performance in March, Bravo–Young was qualified to compete at the U.S. Olympic Team Trials in April 2–3, but chose not to compete due to the impossibility of competing at a non–olympic weight class.

Wrestling style 
Bravo-Young is known for his fancy footwork, speed and ability to explode from a relaxed and elusive stance into a takedown. Defensively, he is known for employing explosive acrobatic flips in order to get out of dangerous situations. Bravo-Young trains with former UFC Champion Dominick Cruz from time to time, who displayed one of the most versatile footwork games in mixed martial arts.

Freestyle record 

! colspan="7"| Senior Freestyle Matches
|-
!  Res.
!  Record
!  Opponent
!  Score
!  Date
!  Event
!  Location
|-
|Win
|8–4
|align=left| Aljamain Sterling
|style="font-size:88%"|6–4
|style="font-size:88%"|December 22, 2020
|style="font-size:88%"|NLWC IV
|style="text-align:left;font-size:88%;" rowspan=2|
 State College, Pennsylvania
|-
|Win
|7–4
|align=left| Shelton Mack
|style="font-size:88%"|TF 11–0
|style="font-size:88%"|October 20, 2020
|style="font-size:88%"|NLWC II
|-
|Win
|6–4
|align=left| Jack Mueller
|style="font-size:88%"|8–1
|style="font-size:88%"|July 25, 2020 
|style="font-size:88%"|FloWrestling: Dake vs. Chamizo
|style="text-align:left;font-size:88%;" |
 Austin, Texas
|-
! style=background:white colspan=7 |
|-
|Loss
|5–4
|align=left| Vitali Arujau
|style="font-size:88%"|TF 0–10
|style="font-size:88%" rowspan=7|June 1–3, 2018
|style="font-size:88%" rowspan=2|2018 UWW U23 World Team Trials
|style="text-align:left;font-size:88%;" rowspan=7|
 Akron, Ohio
|-
|Loss
|5–3
|align=left| Vitali Arujau
|style="font-size:88%"|TF 4–15
|-
|Win
|5–2
|align=left| Charles Tucker
|style="font-size:88%"|4–2
|style="font-size:88%" rowspan=5|2018 UWW U23 Nationals and World Team Trials Challenge
|-
|Win
|4–2
|align=left| Sean Fausz
|style="font-size:88%"|TF 11–0
|-
|Win
|3–2
|align=left| Larry Henderson
|style="font-size:88%"|TF 12–2
|-
|Win
|2–2
|align=left| Mikel Perales
|style="font-size:88%"|TF 13–2
|-
|Win
|1–2
|align=left| Drew West
|style="font-size:88%"|TF 12–2
|-
! style=background:white colspan=7 | 
|-
|Loss
|0–2
|align=left| Jarrod Patterson
|style="font-size:88%"|5–12
|style="font-size:88%" rowspan=2|April 26–29, 2017
|style="font-size:88%" rowspan=2|2017 US Open National Championships
|style="text-align:left;font-size:88%;" rowspan=2|
 Las Vegas, Nevada
|-
|Loss
|0–1
|align=left| Tony Ramos
|style="font-size:88%"|TF 2–12
|-

NCAA record

! colspan="8"| NCAA Division I Record
|-
!  Res.
!  Record
!  Opponent
!  Score
!  Date
!  Event
|-
|Win
|63–9
|align=left| Sheldon Seymour
|style="font-size:88%"|MD 19–7
|style="font-size:88%"|December 5, 2021
|style="font-size:88%"|Lehigh - Penn State Dual
|-
|Win
|62–9
|align=left| Dominice Carone
|style="font-size:88%"|TF 26–11
|style="font-size:88%"|November 18, 2021
|style="font-size:88%"|Army - Penn State Dual
|-
|Win
|61–9
|align=left| Anthony Petrillo
|style="font-size:88%"|Fall
|style="font-size:88%" rowspan=2|November 13, 2021
|style="font-size:88%"|Sacred Heart - Penn State Dual
|-
|Win
|60–9
|align=left| Jason Shaner Jr.
|style="font-size:88%"|8–3
|style="font-size:88%"|Oregon State - Penn State Dual
|-
! style=background:lighgrey colspan=6 |Start of 2021–2022 Season (senior year)
|-
! style=background:lighgrey colspan=6 |End of 2020–2021 Season (junior year)
|-
! style=background:white colspan=6 |2021 NCAA Championships  at 133 lbs
|-
|Win
|59–9
|align=left| Daton Fix
|style="font-size:88%"|SV 4–2
|style="font-size:88%" rowspan=5|March 18–20, 2021
|style="font-size:88%" rowspan=5|2021 NCAA Division I Wrestling Championships
|-
|Win
|58–9
|align=left| Korbin Myers
|style="font-size:88%"|5–3
|-
|Win
|57–9
|align=left| Louie Hayes
|style="font-size:88%"|4–1
|-
|Win
|56–9
|align=left| Kyle Burwick
|style="font-size:88%"|MD 11–3
|-
|Win
|55–9
|align=left| Sean Carter
|style="font-size:88%"|TF 20–5
|-
! style=background:white colspan=6 |2021 Big Ten Conference  at 133 lbs
|-
|Win
|54–9
|align=left| Austin DeSanto
|style="font-size:88%"|5–2
|style="font-size:88%" rowspan=3|March 6–7, 2021
|style="font-size:88%" rowspan=3|2021 Big Ten Conference Championships
|-
|Win
|53-9
|align=left| Chris Cannon
|style="font-size:88%"|8–3
|-
|Win
|52-9
|align=left| Jacob Rundell
|style="font-size:88%"|9–3
|-
|Win
|51–9
|align=left| Jackson Cockrell
|style="font-size:88%"|MD 24–13
|style="font-size:88%"|February 21, 2021
|style="font-size:88%"|Maryland - Penn State Dual
|-
|Win
|50–9
|align=left| Jordan Decatur
|style="font-size:88%"|TF 27–8
|style="font-size:88%"|February 19, 2021
|style="font-size:88%"|Penn State - Ohio State Dual
|-
|Win
|49–9
|align=left| Dylan Ragusin
|style="font-size:88%"|9–2
|style="font-size:88%"|February 14, 2021
|style="font-size:88%"|Penn State - Michigan Dual
|-
|Win
|48–9
|align=left| Kyle Burwick
|style="font-size:88%"|11–6
|style="font-size:88%"|February 2, 2021
|style="font-size:88%"|Penn State - Wisconsin Dual
|-
|Win
|47–9
|align=left| Dylan Utterback
|style="font-size:88%"|Fall
|style="font-size:88%" rowspan=2|January 30, 2021
|style="font-size:88%"|	Penn State - Northwestern Dual
|-
|Win
|46–9
|align=left| Kyle Luigs
|style="font-size:88%"|11–8
|style="font-size:88%"|Penn State - Indiana Dual
|-
! style=background:lighgrey colspan=6 |Start of 2020-2021 Season (junior year)
|-
! style=background:lighgrey colspan=6 |End of 2019-2020 Season (sophomore year)
|-
! style=background:white colspan=6 |2020 Big Ten Conference  at 133 lbs
|-
|Loss
|45-9
|align=left| Sebastian Rivera
|style="font-size:88%"|2-7
|style="font-size:88%" rowspan=3|March 8, 2020
|style="font-size:88%" rowspan=3|2020 Big Ten Championships
|-
|Win
|45-8
|align=left| Austin DeSanto
|style="font-size:88%"|3-2
|-
|Win
|44-8
|align=left| Sammy Alvarez
|style="font-size:88%"|5-2
|-
|Win
|43-8
|align=left| Josh Vega
|style="font-size:88%"|Fall
|style="font-size:88%"|February 23, 2020
|style="font-size:88%"|American - Penn State Dual
|-
|Win
|42-8
|align=left| Jordan Decatur
|style="font-size:88%"|10-4
|style="font-size:88%"|February 15, 2020
|style="font-size:88%"|Ohio State - Penn State Dual
|-
|Win
|41-8
|align=left| Boo Dryden
|style="font-size:88%"|TF 23-8
|style="font-size:88%"|February 9, 2020
|style="font-size:88%"|Penn State - Minnesota Dual
|-
|Loss
|40-8
|align=left| Seth Gross
|style="font-size:88%"|5-6
|style="font-size:88%"|February 7, 2020
|style="font-size:88%"|Penn State - Wisconsin Dual
|-
|Win
|40-7
|align=left| King Sandoval
|style="font-size:88%"|TF 24-9
|style="font-size:88%"|February 2, 2020
|style="font-size:88%"|Maryland - Penn State Dual
|-
|Win
|39-7
|align=left| Austin DeSanto
|style="font-size:88%"|Injury
|style="font-size:88%"|January 31, 2020
|style="font-size:88%"|Penn State - Iowa Dual
|-
|Win
|38-7
|align=left| Ridge Lovett
|style="font-size:88%"|MD 11-3
|style="font-size:88%"|January 24, 2020
|style="font-size:88%"|Penn State - Nebraska Dual
|-
|Win
|37-7
|align=left| Sammy Alvarez
|style="font-size:88%"|SV-2 4-2
|style="font-size:88%"|January 19, 2020
|style="font-size:88%"|Rutgers - Penn State Dual
|-
|Win
|36-7
|align=left| Dylan Utterback
|style="font-size:88%"|TF 23-8
|style="font-size:88%"|January 12, 2020
|style="font-size:88%"|Northwestern - Penn State Dual
|-
! style=background:white colspan=6 |2019 Wilken Open  at 133 lbs
|-
|Win
|35-7
|align=left| Jaret Lane
|style="font-size:88%"|9-3
|style="font-size:88%" rowspan=3|December 22, 2019
|style="font-size:88%" rowspan=3|2019 Wilken Open
|-
|Win
|34-7
|align=left| Brandon Loperfido
|style="font-size:88%"|MD 14-5
|-
|Win
|33-7
|align=left| Justin Mastroianni
|style="font-size:88%"|TF 23-7
|-
|Win
|32-7
|align=left| Carmen Ferrante
|style="font-size:88%"|MD 21-9
|style="font-size:88%"|December 8, 2019
|style="font-size:88%"|Pennsylvania - Penn State Dual
|-
|Win
|31-7
|align=left| Jaret Lane
|style="font-size:88%"|7-2
|style="font-size:88%"|December 6, 2019
|style="font-size:88%"|Penn State - Lehigh Dual
|-
|Win
|30-7
|align=left| Josh Kramer
|style="font-size:88%"|7-6
|style="font-size:88%"|November 22, 2019
|style="font-size:88%"|Penn State - Arizona State Dual
|-
! style=background:white colspan=6 |2019 Black Knight Invite  at 133 lbs
|-
|Win
|29-7
|align=left| Austin Assad
|style="font-size:88%"|MD 17-9
|style="font-size:88%" rowspan=3|November 17, 2019
|style="font-size:88%" rowspan=3|2019 Black Knight Invitational
|-
|Win
|28-7
|align=left| Andrew Wert
|style="font-size:88%"|9-4
|-
|Win
|27-7
|align=left| Shawn Orem
|style="font-size:88%"|MD 20-9
|-
|Win
|26-7
|align=left| Casey Cobb
|style="font-size:88%"|MD 17-6
|style="font-size:88%"|November 10, 2019
|style="font-size:88%"|Navy - Penn State Dual
|-
! style=background:lighgrey colspan=6 |Start of 2019-2020 Season (sophomore year)
|-
! style=background:lighgrey colspan=6 |End of 2018-2019 Season (freshman year)
|-
! style=background:white colspan=6 |2019 NCAA Championships 8th at 133 lbs
|-
|Loss
|25-7
|align=left| Ethan Lizak
|style="font-size:88%"|5-8
|style="font-size:88%" rowspan=7|March 22, 2019
|style="font-size:88%" rowspan=7|2019 NCAA Division I Wrestling Championships
|-
|Loss
|25-6
|align=left| John Erneste
|style="font-size:88%"|MD 0-10
|-
|Win
|25-5
|align=left| Micky Phillippi
|style="font-size:88%"|4-3
|-
|Win
|24-5
|align=left| Ben Thornton
|style="font-size:88%"|3-1
|-
|Win
|23-5
|align=left| Charles Tucker
|style="font-size:88%"|6-2
|-
|Loss
|22-5
|align=left|Austin DeSanto
|style="font-size:88%"|2-7
|-
|Win
|22-4
|align=left| Mario Guillen
|style="font-size:88%"|8-2
|-
! style=background:white colspan=6 |2019 Big Ten Conference 5th at 133 lbs
|-
|Win
|21–4
|align=left| Stevan Mićić
|style="font-size:88%"|MFOR
|style="font-size:88%" rowspan=6|Mar 10, 2019
|style="font-size:88%" rowspan=6|2019 Big Ten Championships
|-
|Loss
|20-4
|align=left| Austin DeSanto
|style="font-size:88%"|8-13
|-
|Win
|20-3
|align=left| Dylan Duncan
|style="font-size:88%"|3-2
|-
|Win
|19-3
|align=left| Jens Lantz
|style="font-size:88%"|MD 14-5
|-
|Loss
|18-3
|align=left| Luke Pletcher
|style="font-size:88%"|5-8
|-
|Win
|18-2
|align=left| Jevon Parrish
|style="font-size:88%"|MD 17-5
|-
|Win
|17-2
|align=left| Derek Spann
|style="font-size:88%"|MD 14-5
|style="font-size:88%"|February 24, 2019
|style="font-size:88%"|Buffalo - Penn State Dual
|-
|Win
|16-2
|align=left| Luke Pletcher
|style="font-size:88%"|TB-2 2-1
|style="font-size:88%"|February 8, 2019
|style="font-size:88%"|Penn State - Ohio State Dual
|-
|Loss
|15-2
|align=left| Ben Thornton
|style="font-size:88%"|3-7
|style="font-size:88%"|January 25, 2019
|style="font-size:88%"|Penn State - Purdue Dual
|-
|Win
|15-1
|align=left| Jevon Parrish
|style="font-size:88%"|MD 20-7
|style="font-size:88%"|January 20, 2019
|style="font-size:88%"|Nebraska - Penn State Dual
|-
|Win
|14-1
|align=left| Jens Lantz
|style="font-size:88%"|MD 12-4
|style="font-size:88%"|January 13, 2019
|style="font-size:88%"|Wisconsin - Penn State Dual
|-
|Win
|13-1
|align=left| Colin Valdiviez
|style="font-size:88%"|15-9
|style="font-size:88%"|January 11, 2019
|style="font-size:88%"|Penn State - Northwestern Dual
|-
! style=background:white colspan=6 |2019 Southern Scuffle  at 133 lbs
|-
|Win
|12-1
|align=left| Sean Nickell
|style="font-size:88%"|MD 10-1
|style="font-size:88%" rowspan=6|January 2, 2019
|style="font-size:88%" rowspan=6|2019 Southern Scuffle
|-
|Win
|11-1
|align=left| Mason Pengilly
|style="font-size:88%"|11-4
|-
|Loss
|10-1
|align=left| Austin Gomez
|style="font-size:88%"|Fall
|-
|Win
|10-0
|align=left| Collin Gerardi
|style="font-size:88%"|8-6
|-
|Win
|9-0
|align=left| Nick Farro
|style="font-size:88%"|4-1
|-
|Win
|8-0
|align=left| Dalton Young
|style="font-size:88%"|4-3
|-
|Win
|7-0
|align=left| Ryan Millhof
|style="font-size:88%"|MD 14-1
|style="font-size:88%"|December 14, 2018
|style="font-size:88%"|Arizona State - Penn State Dual
|-
|Win
|6-0
|align=left| Brandon Paetzell
|style="font-size:88%"|MD 13-5
|style="font-size:88%"|December 2, 2018
|style="font-size:88%"|Lehigh - Penn State Dual
|-
|Win
|5-0
|align=left| David Campbell
|style="font-size:88%"|MD 21-7
|style="font-size:88%"|November 30, 2018
|style="font-size:88%"|Penn State - Bucknell Dual
|-
! style=background:white colspan=6 |2018 Keystone Classic  at 133 lbs
|-
|Win
|4-0
|align=left| Chandler Olson
|style="font-size:88%"|TF 24-9
|style="font-size:88%" rowspan=3|November 18, 2018
|style="font-size:88%" rowspan=3|2018 Keystone Classic
|-
|Win
|3-0
|align=left| Lukus Stricker
|style="font-size:88%"|Injury
|-
|Win
|2-0
|align=left|Jon Guevara
|style="font-size:88%"|Fall
|-
|Win
|1-0
|align=left| Tim Rooney
|style="font-size:88%"|Fall
|style="font-size:88%"|November 11, 2018
|style="font-size:88%"|Kent State - Penn State Dual
|-
! style=background:lighgrey colspan=6 |Start of 2018-2019 Season (freshman year)

Stats 

!  Season
!  Year
!  School
!  Rank
!  Weigh Class
!  Record
!  Win
!  Bonus
|-
|2021
|Junior
|style="font-size:88%" rowspan=3|Penn State University
|#2 (1st)
|style="font-size:88%" rowspan=3|133
|14–0
|100.00%
|35.71%
|-
|2020
|Sophomore
|#7 (DNQ)
|20–2
|90.91%
|50.00%
|-
|2019
|Freshman
|#11 (8th)
|25–7
|78.13%
|37.50%
|-
|colspan=5 bgcolor="LIGHTGREY"|Career
|bgcolor="LIGHTGREY"|59–9
|bgcolor="LIGHTGREY"|86.76%
|bgcolor="LIGHTGREY"|41.18%

Awards and honors 

2020
NCAA Division I First Team All-American (133 lbs)
 Big Ten Conference (133 lbs)
2019
 Junior Pan American Championship (61 kg)
NCAA Division I All-American (133 lbs)

References

External links 
 

Living people
1999 births
American male sport wrestlers
Penn State Nittany Lions wrestlers
Sportspeople from Tucson, Arizona
Amateur wrestlers
African-American sport wrestlers
Pennsylvania State University alumni
21st-century African-American sportspeople